Mestský štadión Bardejov is a football stadium in Bardejov, Slovakia.  It is the home ground of a local club Partizán Bardejov.  The stadium holds 3,435 people. In 2012, the stadium hosted the final match of Slovak Cup.

Reconstruction
In 2015, reconstruction began on the stadium. The estimated cost was €1.5 million. Reconstruction ended in March 2017. The athletic oval was demolished and stadium has been aimed only for football.

Image Gallery

External links 
Stadium website

References

Football venues in Slovakia
Bardejov
Sport in Bardejov
Sports venues completed in 1966
1966 establishments in Slovakia